Duje Ajduković (born 5 February 2001) is a Croatian tennis player. He has a career high ATP singles ranking of World No. 230 achieved on 16 May 2022. He also has a career high ATP doubles ranking of No. 491 achieved on 16 May 2022. Ajduković has won 6 ITF titles, 4 singles and 2 doubles.

Professional career
Ajduković made his ATP main draw debut at the 2021 Croatia Open Umag after receiving a wildcard into the singles and doubles main draws.

Challenger and Itf Futures/World Tennis Tour Finals

Singles: 6 (4-2)

Doubles: 1 (2–1)

References

External links

2001 births
Living people
Croatian male tennis players
Tennis players from Split, Croatia
Tennis players from Zagreb
21st-century Croatian people